A runway is a strip of land at an airport on which aircraft can take off and land.

Runway may also refer to:

 Runway (fashion), a narrow, usually elevated platform that runs into an auditorium, used by models

Film and television 
 Runway (2004 film), an Indian Malayalam-language crime drama
 Runway (2009 film), an Indian Hindi action film
 Runway (2010 film), a Bangladeshi film directed by Tareque Masud
 Runway, a 2020 Japanese film
 The Runway, a 2010 film based on a 1983 incident in Mallow, County Cork, Ireland
 Runway (game show), a 1987–1993 UK daytime quiz programme

Music 
 Runway (album), by AOA, 2016
 "Runway", a song by Duke Dumont, 2018
 "Rnw@y", a song by Linkin Park from Reanimation, 2002
 "Runway", a song by Mariah Carey from Caution, 2018
 "The Runway", a song by the Grass Roots from Move Along, 1972

Other uses 
 Runway (Transformers), a fictional character in Transformers: Armada
 Runway, a fictional fashion magazine in the novel The Devil Wears Prada and the adapted film
 Runway bus, in computer circuitry, a front side bus developed by HP

See also
 Project Runway, an American reality television series
 Roll way, in a rubber-tyred metro
 Runaway (disambiguation)